Mariliana rupicola is a species of beetle in the family Cerambycidae. It was described by Lane in 1970. It is known from Brazil.

References

Hemilophini
Beetles described in 1970